Clarence Edwards Case (September 24, 1877, Jersey City, New Jersey – September 3, 1961, Somerville, New Jersey) was the acting governor of New Jersey in 1920.

Case graduated from Rutgers University in and was awarded a LL.B. degree from New York Law School in 1902. He practiced as a lawyer, and was clerk of the New Jersey Senate Judiciary Committee from 1908 to 1910. From 1918 to 1929, he was a member of the New Jersey Senate representing Somerset County. As senate president he served as acting governor from January 13, 1920, until January 20, 1920, in the week between the end of the term of William Nelson Runyon, the preceding acting governor, and the start of Edward I. Edwards' term as governor. Case served on the New Jersey Supreme Court from 1929 to 1952, and was the Chief Justice from 1946 to 1948.

Case died on September 3, 1961, in Somerville, New Jersey, where he resided after retiring.

His nephew, Clifford P. Case represented New Jersey in the United States House of Representatives (1945–1953) and United States Senate (1955–1979).

See also
List of governors of New Jersey

References

External links
New Jersey Governor Clarence Edwards Case, National Governors Association
 Clarence Edward Case at The Political Graveyard

1877 births
1961 deaths
Republican Party governors of New Jersey
New Jersey lawyers
New York Law School alumni
Chief Justices of the Supreme Court of New Jersey
Justices of the Supreme Court of New Jersey
Republican Party New Jersey state senators
Politicians from Somerville, New Jersey
Politicians from Jersey City, New Jersey
Presidents of the New Jersey Senate
American Episcopalians
Rutgers University alumni